Syd Roberts (March 1911 – after 1938) was an English professional footballer who played as an inside forward.

Career
Born in Bootle, Roberts signed for Liverpool in 1929, and made his senior debut in April 1932. He left Liverpool in August 1937, later playing for Shrewsbury Town, Chester and Northfleet United.

External links
LFChistory profile

1911 births
Year of death missing
English footballers
Liverpool F.C. players
Shrewsbury Town F.C. players
Chester City F.C. players
Northfleet United F.C. players
English Football League players
Association football inside forwards
Sportspeople from Bootle